Arturo Alvarado Pérez (born August 17, 1987 in Monterrey, Nuevo León, México) is a former professional Mexican footballer who last played for Alebrijes de Oaxaca.

External links

Arturo Perez at Asceno MX

1987 births
Living people
Sportspeople from Monterrey
Association football midfielders
Mexican footballers
C.F. Monterrey players
Querétaro F.C. footballers
San Luis F.C. players
Indios de Ciudad Juárez footballers
Irapuato F.C. footballers
Venados F.C. players
Correcaminos UAT footballers
Club Atlético Zacatepec players
Atlético San Luis footballers
Liga MX players